Sorry, We're Open is the third studio album by Berlin-based indie punk band Bonaparte. It was released on August 17, 2012, preceded by a first single, "Quarantine", on June 22.

Track listing
All songs written by Tobias Jundt except where noted.
"When the Ship Is Thinking" – 2:37
"Quarantine" (feat. Housemeister) (T. Jundt, Housemeister) – 3:07
"Sorry We're Open" (T. Jundt, D. Szigeti) – 3:29
"C'est à moi qu'tu parles?" (T. Jundt, Housemeister) – 4:10
"40°42'48.46 N 73°58'18.38 W" (T. Jundt, Housemeister, M. Black) – 1:00
"Point & Shoot" (feat. Siriusmo) (T. Jundt, M. Friedrich) – 3:11
"A Little Braindead" (T. Jundt, C. Bruck) – 3:12
"Mañana Forever" – 3:27
"Alles schon gesehen" (feat. Deichkind) (T. Jundt, P. Gruetering) – 3:07
"53°32'26.81 N 09°58'47.28 E" – 1:50
"Quick Fix" – 3:04
"High Heels to Hell" – 4:04
"In the Breaks" – 3:45
"40°51'42.94 S 173°00'46.63 W" (T. Jundt, U. Gincel) – 1:34
"Bonahula" – 3:29

Bonus Tracks
"In & Out" (T. Jundt, Housemeister, M. Black) – 3:50
"21°28'52.30 N 175°56'58.07 W" – 1:48
 Vinyl bonus tracks & CD hidden tracks
"Louie Louie" (Richard Berry) – 3:14
 Vinyl & Amazon digital download bonus track
"Sex Dwarf" (D. Ball, M. Almond) – 3:32
 Vinyl & iTunes bonus track
"Quarantine" (Acoustic Version) – 3:47
 Vinyl hidden track

Notes
"When the Ship Is Thinking" is based on the poem «The Sea Gypsy» by Richard Hovey.
"High Heels to Hell" is a re-working of the previously released B-side "Things Are More Like They Are Now".
"In & Out" is an extended/alternate version of "40°42'48.46 N 73°58'18.38 W".

References

2012 albums
Bonaparte (band) albums